The  ("The Seven Abdullah") are the most famous Abdullah among the companions of the Islamic prophet, Muhammad. They are seven individuals who goes by the name Abdullah as the names stated.

 Ibn Abbas
 Ibn Umar
 Ibn Mas’ud
 Ibn Rawahah
 Ibn Salam
 Ibn 'Amr al-'As
 Ibn Abi Awfa

References

Companions of the Prophet